SK1, known in the US as Serial Killer 1, is a 2014 French thriller drama film directed by Frédéric Tellier. The term "SK1" is a codename given by the police to the first serial killer who was identified and arrested via DNA analysis in France.

Plot 
The film chronicles the hunt and trial of a 1990s serial killer, dubbed "The Beast of the Bastille".

Synopsis 
The film is set in Paris in 1991. The true story of Franck Magne, a young inspector starting out in the Criminal Investigation Department at 36 quai des Orfèvres, in the Crime Squad. His first case deals with the murder of a young woman. His investigation leads him to study similar cases that he's the only one to link together. He's quickly confronted by the reality of police investigation work: the lack of equipment, bureaucracy... For 8 years, obsessed by this investigation, he'll hunt the serial killer that no one else believes exists. As a decade goes by, the victims multiply and leads become muddled. The gap between the brutal murders grows shorter. Franck Magne hunts down the monster that begins to emerge, so as to stop him for good. The inspector from the Crime Squad becomes the architect of the most complex and vast investigation ever undertaken by the French Criminal Investigation Department. During it, Magne crosses paths with Frédérique Pons, a dedicated lawyer determined to understand the destiny of the man hidden behind this merciless killer. The film plunges us into 10 years of investigation, amongst opinionated cops, determined judges, conscientious forensic policemen, and impassioned lawyers who will all be affected by this case that became the sensational "Guy Georges, the killer of Eastern Paris" case.

Cast 
 Raphaël Personnaz as Franck Magne (Charlie)
 Nathalie Baye as Frédérique Pons
 Olivier Gourmet as Bougon  
 Michel Vuillermoz as Carbonnel  
 Adama Niane as Guy Georges
 Christa Théret as Elisabeth Ortega 
 Thierry Neuvic as Jensen 
 William Nadylam as the advocat of Guy Georges 
 Marianne Denicourt as Martine Monteil
 Chloë Stéfani as Corinne
 Benjamin Lavernhe as Frédéric Brunet

Accolades

See also 

 List of French films of 2014

References

External links 
 

2014 films
2014 crime thriller films
2014 thriller drama films
2010s French-language films
French crime thriller films
French drama films
Films about lawyers
Drama films based on actual events
2014 directorial debut films
2014 drama films
2010s French films